Nabin Subba (Limbu) (born 14 December 1967) is a Nepalese film director, screenwriter and producer. He is generally regarded as a leading figure and pioneer of the "Fourth Cinema" movement in Nepalese cinema, making the film base on Nepalese indigenous community. His works Khangri and Numafung were awarded in many film festivals around the globe. His last major project was Goodbye Kathmandu, which is due for release soon. He also directed  a 52-episode TV serial called Dalan, about Dalit (the untouchables in Nepal), which he completed in 2006 and which aired from NTV 2008/2009. The TV serial was one of the most popular serial in the history of Nepal television, and was nominated for One world media trust, UK for outstanding work on social issue in developing countries.

He is one of the first filmmakers to take Nepali films to the international arena, participating in international film festivals.

Subba also heads the Indigenous Film Archive (IFA), which has organized the Nepal International Indigenous film Festival (NIIFF) in Kathmandu annually for the past nine years.

Career
Subba started his career by directing plays for theatre, winning the Best Play of the Year from Royal Nepal Academy in 1988.

He also enjoyed a parallel career in journalism and worked as a correspondent for the weekly Nepali Awaj (1989-1992), the daily Nepali Patra (1992-1994) and Deshanter Weekly (1994-1997). He also worked as the editor of the monthly Rup Rang Entertainment (1994-1995) and Nepathya, a theater magazine in 1995. He continues to contribute articles to various newspapers and magazines.

Early work
 Khangri (The Mountain)
 Numafung
 Goodbye Kathmandu

TV series
 Tareba - He wrote and directed this tele-film for Nepal Television, based on Limbu culture.
 Dalan
 Singha Durbar Season 2

References
http://www.imdb.com/name/nm1451399/
http://www.myrepublica.com/portal/index.php?action=news_details&news_id=11660

Nepalese film directors
Living people
1967 births
People from Taplejung District
Limbu people
21st-century Nepalese screenwriters